Ally Leigh Ewing (née McDonald; born October 25, 1992) is an American professional golfer and plays on the LPGA Tour.

McDonald was born in Tupelo, Mississippi and grew up in Fulton, Mississippi. She played college golf at Mississippi State University where she won five events.  She also won the Mississippi State Amateur twice and the North and South Women's Amateur. She played on the winning U.S. teams in the 2013 Spirit International Amateur Golf Championship and the 2014 Curtis Cup.

McDonald turned professional after graduating from college in 2015. She finished T-22 at the LPGA Final Qualifying Tournament to earn a conditional LPGA Tour card for 2016. She played primarily on the Symetra Tour in 2016, finishing runner-up four times and finishing second on the money list. She has played full-time on the LPGA Tour since 2017.

In 2019, she was named to the 2019 Solheim Cup team to replace an injured Stacy Lewis.

In October 2020, McDonald won the LPGA Drive On Championship. This was her first LPGA victory. The tournament was a new event, created in 2020 due to the cancellation of Asian events as a result of the COVID-19 pandemic.

McDonald started using her married name, Ally Ewing, in late 2020.

In May 2021, Ewing won the Bank of Hope LPGA Match-Play at Shadow Creek Golf Course in North Las Vegas, Nevada. She went 6–1–0 for the week and defeated Sophia Popov in the final match, 2 & 1.

Personal life
Ewing is a Christian. She is married to Charlie Ewing.

Professional wins (3)

LPGA Tour wins (3)

Amateur wins
2011 Big I National, Mississippi State Amateur
2012 Mississippi State Amateur, Las Vegas Collegiate Showdown
2013 NCAA Division 1 Central Regional, North and South Women's Amateur, Old Waverly Bulldog Invite
2014 The Schooner Fall Classic, Old Waverly Bulldog Invite

Source:

Results in LPGA majors
Results not in chronological order before 2019 or in 2020.

CUT = missed the half-way cut
NT = no tournament
"T" = tied

Summary

Most consecutive cuts made – 9 (2019 Evian – 2021 WPGA)
Longest streak of top-10s – 2 (2019 ANA – 2019 U.S. Open)

World ranking
Position in Women's World Golf Rankings at the end of each calendar year.

Team appearances
Amateur
The Spirit International Amateur Golf Championship (representing the United States): 2013 (winners)
Curtis Cup (representing the United States): 2014 (winners)

Professional
Solheim Cup (representing the United States): 2019, 2021

Solheim Cup record

References

External links

American female golfers
Mississippi State Lady Bulldogs golfers
LPGA Tour golfers
Golfers from Mississippi
Sportspeople from Tupelo, Mississippi
People from Fulton, Mississippi
1992 births
Living people
21st-century American women